Alice T. Wadowski-Bak (August 8, 1935 – June 14, 2008) was a noted Polish-American artist and creator of wycinanki (paper-cutting). Her most famous work is Wigilia, which has been the cover art of Oplatek sold across the U.S. Ms. Wadowski-Bak's work has been exhibited at the Albright Knox in Buffalo, the Boston Institute of Contemporary Art and the Pittsburgh Center for the Arts.

Life
Trained in Buffalo NY, Alice's art caught the eye of Buffalo Society of Artists president, Polish Arts Club of Buffalo founder and esteemed artist Eugene Dyczkowski. Dyczkowski offered the young artist a scholarship. Unfortunately for Alice she was not able to accept it at the time. Ms. Bak was able to attend Syracuse University for her master's of fine art, and completed her studies at the University at Buffalo. She moved to New York City and worked as a book illustrator and fabric designer.  Ms. Bak was the art instructor to Caroline Kennedy in the 1960s. Vincent Price was a fan of her artwork. Bak, a devout Catholic,  also created a painting that was presented to Pope John Paul II, and hangs in the Vatican on permanent exhibition.

After working in New York City, Bak returned to Niagara Falls. She worked with the Polish School at Holy Trinity Church. In 1996 Ms. Bak won the Am-Pol Eagle Citizen of the Year Award for Media. On June 14, 2008 Alice Wadowski-Bak died and is interred at Holy Trinity Cemetery, Lewiston, NY.

Works
Wigilia,
Sleeping Beauty,
Broadway-Fillmore (1982)

Book Illustrations
Polish Folklore and Myth by Joanne Asala,
Polish Proverbs by Joanne Asala,
The Owl's Nest: Folk Tales from Friesland by Dorothy Gladys Spicer

References
http://www.ampoleagle.com/default.asp?sourceid=&smenu=1&twindow=&mad=&sdetail=912&wpage=1&skeyword=&sidate=&ccat=&ccatm=&restate=&restatus=&reoption=&retype=&repmin=&repmax=&rebed=&rebath=&subname=&pform=&sc=2519&hn=ampoleagle&he=.com
http://www.legacy.com/buffalonews/DeathNotices.asp?Page=LifeStory&PersonID=111773606

American artists
1935 births
2008 deaths
American people of Polish descent
University at Buffalo alumni